Radziner or Radzyner may refer to:

Radziner Chassidim, followers of the Izhbitza – Radzin (Hasidic dynasty)
Ron Radziner, a principal of Los Angeles-based architectural firm Marmol Radziner
Radzyner Law School, at the Interdisciplinary Center in Herzliya, Israel
Joanna Radzyner, an Austrian journalist